Lasiorhachis is a genus of flowering plant in the family Poaceae, native to Madagascar. The taxon was first described as a subdivision of Andropogon by Eduard Hackel in 1889 and raised to a genus by Otto Stapf in 1927.

Species
, Plants of the World Online accepted the following species:
Lasiorhachis hildebrandtii (Hack.) Stapf
Lasiorhachis perrieri (A.Camus) Bosser
Lasiorhachis viguieri (A.Camus) Bosser

References

Panicoideae
Poaceae genera
Taxa named by Eduard Hackel